Taylor Tolleson (born July 13, 1985) is an American former cyclist.

On July 23, 2009, while riding on his motorcycle, Tolleson was the victim of a hit-and-run, forcing him to end his career at 25. He suffered from severe head trauma and vertebrae fractures. He sued the driver, who was under the influence of drugs at the time of the incident.

Major results
2005
 1st Stage 5 Cascade Classic
2007
 1st Stage 6 Tour de Toona
2008
 1st Tour de Leelanau

References

External links
 
 

1985 births
Living people
American male cyclists